Die Fahne Hoch may refer to:
 "Horst-Wessel-Lied", also known as Die Fahne Hoch
 Die Fahne Hoch! (Frank Stella), a painting by an American artist